Sorority Sisters is an eight title novel series that was written by Marjorie W. Sharmat between 1986 and 1987. They were published by Laurel Leaf Press. This series focused on two very different sororities in a fictitious high school in Arizona. In contrast to most teen romance series, (which were common and quite prolific at that time) this series was written with kind of a sense of humor.

Plot summary 
At Palm Canyon High School located in fictitious Palm Canyon, Arizona, most girls aspired to be members of Chi Kappa, the most prestigious sorority at the school. One of their many rules was that they kept membership strictly at ten members.

A girl named Elissa Hanes wanted to join, as did her friend Kim Adler. Kim was accepted along with a newcomer, and Elissa wasn't accepted. However, Kim eventually got disgusted with the sorority's scheming tactics, and quit the group in public.

Elissa and Kim eventually created their own sorority called The Pack, which welcomed any girl who wanted to join, and the 10-member number, which Chi Kappa used so often to be their limit, would just be a number to legitimize the Pack and make them a solid group.

Another former Chi Kappa member, Tracy McVane, a friend of Elissa's, joined the Pack herself, after being burned by Chi Kappa's less than ethical behavior.  Some of the other Chi Kappa members, Melanie Deborah Kane and Daisy Baron for example, were also allies of the Pack, despite their membership in the more established Chi Kappa.

Although they never reached ten, their core group was just as solid. The officers were de facto until the next year.

Many of the stories (which covered two books, and there were eight in all) focused on the lives of the students and the rivalry between the two sororities: the established Chi Kappa vs. the up-and-coming Pack. The characters narrated the stories. The most narrators came from the Pack (they had five to Chi Kappa's three).

As was unusual for a romance book series, it was written with a sense of humor, especially through Elissa Hanes, who would give off horrid but funny puns.

Palm Canyon was supposedly located somewhere around Tucson, because some of the characters could and did import dates from that area; they also imported dates from the Phoenix area.

Titles 

Narrators for and titles of the stories were:

Book 1:  For Members Only. Kim Adler (Co-founder of the Pack who, in anger, quit Chi Kappa in public)
Book 2:  Snobs Beware. Elissa Haines (Kim's best friend, and co-founder of the Pack.)
Book 3:  I Think I'm Falling in Love. Tracy McVane  (Newspaper editor who quit Chi Kappa in disgust and joined the Pack.)
Book 4:  Fighting Over Me. Fritzi Tass   (A loyal Pack member, who becomes Tracy's best friend.)
Book 5:  Nobody knows How Scared I am. Daisy Baron   (The nicer half of twins who is a Chi Kappa member and an ally of the Pack)
Book 6:  Here Comes Mr. Right. Melanie Deborah Kane (Chi Kappa's resident Survivor, who is also a Pack ally.)
Book 7:  Getting Closer. Bridget Jawinski  (A member of the Pack who is in Palm Canyon's Senior class.)
Book 8:  I'm Going to Get Your Boyfriend. Rona Dunne  (Chi Kappa's remote but amicable  president.)

Reception 
Publishers Weekly reviewed the first book in the series: "Although not as funny as Sheila Greenwald's Rosy Cole books, which are aimed at the same audience, this attractively designed, easy-to-read title will undoubtedly garner its own fans".

References 

Sorority Sisters
Sorority Sisters
Novels set in high schools and secondary schools